Monaco competed at the 1984 Summer Olympics in Los Angeles, United States. The nation returned to the Summer Games after participating in the American-led boycott of the 1980 Summer Olympics. Eight competitors, all men, took part in seven events in five sports.

Archery

 Gilles Cresto — 2389 points (→ 39th place)

Fencing

One fencer represented Monaco in 1984.

Men's sabre
 Olivier Martini

Judo

Shooting

Swimming

Men's 100m Freestyle
Jean-Luc Adomo
 Heat — 56.38 (→ did not advance, 56th place)

References

External links
Official Olympic Reports

Nations at the 1984 Summer Olympics
1984
1984 in Monégasque sport